The Multinational Medical Coordination Centre/European Medical Command (MMCC/EMC) is a medical coordinating centre in support of the European medical services. It is directly subordinated to the German Armed Forces Joint Medical Service Command and the German Surgeon General. It was formed on 1 April 2018 in the Rhine-Barracks, Koblenz, Germany, where it also has its HQ.

History

On 2 May 2017, the Surgeon Generals from eight European NATO members states signed a fundamental document towards an intensified and sustainable cooperation within the context of NATO's Framework Nations Concept (FNC) Cluster Medical Support. After signing this Declaration of Intent at the cornerstone-laying ceremony at the Ehrenbreitstein Fortress in Koblenz, Germany, a collective planning and coordinating unit for European Armed Forces was going to be formed - the Multinational Medical Coordination Centre. To support the collaboration of Medical Commands on a multinational level in an effective and goal-oriented way, this Multinational Coordination Centre was set up under the lead management on the German Armed Forces Joint Medical Service Command and is run together with all participating nations. The multinational staffed department started working in April 2018. In the following year, the cooperation with the Centre of Excellence in Military Medicine (MilMedCoE) regarding some fields was intensified. Also, the British Defence Medical Service (DMS) joined the MMCC as the then ninth member.

In 2019, the PESCO project European Medical Command (EMC) was ordered to work with the MMCC by the German General Surgeon. This meant virtually merging both projects into one entity, and setting up staff for both at the same time - following the motto "two initiatives – one task". Consequentially, the MMCC/EMC was formed, celebrating its Initial Operation Capability (IOC) on 3 and 4 September with an opening ceremony at the Ehrenbreitstein Fortress and Rhine-Barracks both in Koblenz, Germany. Here, the Surgeon Generals of 14 nations signed a Declaration merging both organizations, the MMCC (NATO/FNC) and EMC (EU/PESCO), into one: MMCC/EMC. This unique department proves the growing cooperation between NATO and the EU.
Signing the Declaration of Initial Operational Capability MMCC/EMC during the COMEDs Plenary in Brussels on 27 November 2019, Slovakia became the 15th member nation. In the course of 2020, Poland, Spain and Lithuania also signed the Declaration on the Initial Operational Capability of the MMCC/EMC, so that currently 18 nations are member states of the MMCC/EMC.

Through its recent agreement with the United States Army the Multinational Medical Coordination Center/ European Medical Command (MMCC/EMCy) is tightening its network of international contacts once again. On May 11, 30th Medical Brigade Commander Colonel Jason Wieman and MMCC/EMC Director Surgeon General Dr. Stefan Kowitz signed the protocol for the assignment of a United States Army Europe and Africa (USAREUR-AF) Liaison Officer to MMCC/EMC in Koblenz.

The Full Operational Capability (FOC) of the MMCC/EMC was signed by the nations during the NATO COMEDS Plenary in Madrid on 30 May 2022.

Mission

The main mission of the MMCC/EMC is the creation of the necessary conditions for the multinational medical support of Armed Forces within their wide range of tasks, supporting the already growing development towards more international cooperation. It also functions as a catalyst for the field of Capability Enhancement. 

Specific tasks include:
 Setting up a resource-saving network of existing and new specialists and respectively coordinating this hub,
 Maintaining a coordinating function in multinational Capability Enhancement within the Framework Nations Concept Cluster Medical Support,
 Working together with military units and NATO departments, the EU and other national and international organizations and task forces in the Medical Capability Enhancement   as well as setting up Larger Formations.

Structure

Subordinated to Director MMCC/EMC

 Directory – Leading/Steering
 Deputy Director NATO matters
 Deputy Director EU matters
 Executive Officer
 Support Element – Coordination & Support
 Branch Ops/Plans
 Branch Wargaming/Exercises
 Branch Medical Logistics
 Branch Telehealth/medCBRN
 Branch Medical Situational Awareness / Civil-Military Interface

Leadership

See also
 Permanent Structured Cooperation
 United States Army Medical Command
 Enhanced cooperation
 European Air Transport Command
 Multinational Medical Coordination Centre
 European Medical Corps
 NATO

References

External links
 Description
 Press article
  Website MMCC/EMC (in German)

NATO
Permanent Structured Cooperation projects
Proposed international organizations
International military organizations
International organizations based in Europe